Gilbert Patterson may refer to:

Gilbert B. Patterson (1863–1922), American politician
Gilbert E. Patterson (1939–2007), American minister